Bakhram Mendibaev (born 27 August 1983) is an Uzbekistani weightlifter. He competed for Uzbekistan at the 2012 Summer Olympics.

In 2013 Mendibaev was suspended for two years for using the banned substance stanozolol.

References

Uzbekistani male weightlifters
Weightlifters at the 2012 Summer Olympics
Olympic weightlifters of Uzbekistan
1983 births
Living people
Weightlifters at the 2010 Asian Games
Doping cases in weightlifting
Uzbekistani sportspeople in doping cases
Asian Games competitors for Uzbekistan
21st-century Uzbekistani people